John Thomas Dooling (February 22, 1871 – November 15, 1949) was the assistant district attorney for New York City and an adviser to Tammany Hall for 40 years.

Biography
Dooling was born on February 22, 1871, in Brooklyn, New York City. He died on November 15, 1949, in White Plains, New York.

References

1871 births
1949 deaths
Lawyers from New York City
People from Brooklyn
American prosecutors